Maitighar ( Maternal home) is a 1966 Nepali film directed by B.S. Thapa. It was the third Nepali film produced and the first featured film under a private banner. This film features bollywood actress Mala Sinha in the lead role with Nepali actor Chidambar Prasad Lohani. It is considered as a classic in Nepali cinema.

Plot 
A girl who was born in Pokhara was sent to jail for 15 years but she didn't want to go out of the jail then police officer calls a psychiatrist(doctor)then she tells her story to him.

She tells the story of falling in love with and marrying Mohan and living a simple life with him. But they get separated from each other when Mohan goes to the jungle for the hunt to kill animals but he comes home dead.

After the death of Mohan, his mother calls Maya a witch who killed her son (common superstition at that time in Nepal) and everyone calls her witch and they say "Wish she died before birth".

Then she gets blamed for everything that happens in the village and Mohan's mother takes her son away. After that she decides to leave the village than living in a house like a hell. While she was leaving her house people find her then start to chase her down.

Then she finds a woman at a random place who sells her as a dancer and locks her down in her house. She tries to escape that place and when all goes in vain, she tries to kill herself in that room but fails.

After while she accepts her job but she wishes to see her son "Ratu" but they say you can't see him than she starts to beg to she her son after that they let her see her son

After that, she joins a college for speaking she tells everyone about the old Nepal from her religious Hindu book. She gives advice to everyone about living life.

After she returns from college in kathmandu, her master "Sahuji" blackmails to bring her daughter(Rekha) into prostitution.she kills Sahuji by poisoning his food and gets sentenced to prison for 15 years. Then she meets her son at the prison as a police officer.

Than her son and her meet her daughter as last wish of her before going to the prison. After telling the story she kills herself at the prison. After they resized the police officer and her mitini were her children. The films end with her death with a song.

Cast 
Mala Sinha as Maya - the key cast/role in this movie. She is married to Mohan and was sentenced to 15 years in prison. 
Chidambar Prasad Lohani as Mohan/Moha as a son Ravi 
Yadav Kharel
Tika Bhushan Dahal
Yam Bahadur Khadka
Sunita Regmi
Yadu Kumari
Pratibha Sam
Jana Darshan Sam
Gopi Krishna
K.B. Lamichhane
Keshab Rana
B.S. Thapa 
Nanda Kishore Timilsina
Sunil Dutt in a special appearance
Rajendra Nath in a special appearance

Soundtrack

The music was scored by Jaidev, a veteran music maestro. Lata Mangeshkar, Asha Bhosle, Usha Mangeshkar, Manna Dey and Geeta Dutt did the playback singing, along with Nepali singers Prem Dhoj Pradhan, C.P. Lohani and Aruna Lama. Lata Mangeshkar sang a Nepali song that was penned by the late King Mahendra Bir Bikram Shah Dev of Nepal.

Production 
Maitighar was the first film to be produced under a private banner in Nepal. It had many Indians contributing towards the making of the film - actors, musicians and technicians. The place where the office for film shooting was established in Kathmandu, Nepal has been named Maitighar after the movie.

Reception 
Maithighar was a commercially successful movie in Nepal after the success of the movie the place this movie was filmed in got named Maithighar.

Gallery

References

External links
 Songs of Maitighar 
 Maitighar Lyrics

See also
List of Nepalese films
Cinema of Nepal

Nepalese drama films
Nepali-language films
1966 films
Films shot in Pokhara
Cultural depictions of Nepalese women